Meyerton Commando was a light infantry regiment of the South African Army. It formed part of the South African Army Infantry Formation as well as the South African Territorial Reserve.

History

Origin
This unit was originally known as the De Deur Commando.

Operations

With the SADF

The units changed its name to the Meyerton Commando from 1 January 1971. 

During the retirement function of Commandant Dirk Burger in May 1975, a revue parade was held in Meyerton.

The old school building of Laerskool Voorwaarts was used as its headquarters from 1982.

Freedom of Entry
The unit received its Freedom of Entry to Meyerton on 10 April 1984.

With the SANDF

Disbandment
This unit, along with all other Commando units was disbanded after a decision by South African President Thabo Mbeki to disband all Commando Units. The Commando system was phased out between 2003 and 2008 "because of the role it played in the apartheid era", according to the Minister of Safety and Security Charles Nqakula.

Leadership

Unit Insignia

References

See also 
 South African Commando System

Infantry regiments of South Africa
South African Commando Units